Herbert Lionel Adolphus Hart  (18 July 190719 December 1992) was an English legal philosopher. He was the Professor of Jurisprudence at Oxford University and the Principal of Brasenose College, Oxford. His most famous work is The Concept of Law, which has been hailed as "the most important work of legal philosophy written in the twentieth century". He is considered one of the world's foremost legal philosophers in the twentieth century, alongside Hans Kelsen.

Early life and education
Herbert Lionel Adolphus Hart was born on 18 July 1907, the son of Rose Samson Hart and Simeon Hart, in Harrogate, to which his parents had moved from the East End of London. His father was a Jewish tailor of German and Polish origin; his mother, of Polish origin, daughter of successful retailers in the clothing trade, handled customer relations and the finances of their firm. Hart had an elder brother, Albert, and a younger sister, Sybil.

Hart was educated at Cheltenham College, Bradford Grammar School and at New College, Oxford. He took a first in classical greats in 1929.

Hart became a barrister and practised successfully at the Chancery Bar from 1932 to 1940. He was good friends with Richard (later Lord) Wilberforce, Douglas Jay, and Christopher Cox, among others. He received a Harmsworth Scholarship to the Middle Temple and also wrote literary journalism for the periodical John O'London's Weekly.

World War II 
During the Second World War, Hart worked with MI5, a division of British military intelligence concerned with unearthing spies who had penetrated Britain, where he renewed Oxford friendships including working with the philosophers Gilbert Ryle and Stuart Hampshire. He worked closely with Dick White, later head of MI5 and then of MI6. Hart worked at Bletchley Park and was a colleague of the mathematician and codebreaker Alan Turing.

Hart's war work took him on occasion to MI5 offices at Blenheim Palace, family home of the Dukes of Marlborough and the place where Winston Churchill had been born.  He enjoyed telling the story that there he was able to read the diaries of Sarah Churchill, Duchess of Marlborough, wife of the founder of the dynasty John Churchill, 1st Duke of Marlborough.  Hart's wit and humanity are demonstrated by the fact that he particularly enjoyed the passage where Sarah tells that John had been away for a long time, had arrived suddenly, and "enjoyed me straight way in his boots".  Another incident of life at Blenheim which Hart enjoyed recounting was that he shared an office with one of the famous Cambridge spies, Anthony Blunt, a fellow member of MI5.  Hart wondered which of the papers on his desk Blunt had managed to read and to pass on to his Soviet controllers.

Hart did not return to his legal practice after the war, preferring instead to accept the offer of a teaching fellowship (in philosophy, not law) at New College, Oxford. Hart cites J. L. Austin as particularly influential during this time. The two jointly taught from 1948 a seminar on 'Legal and Moral Responsibility'. Among Hart's publications at this time were the essays 'A Logician's Fairytale', 'Is There Knowledge by Acquaintance?', 'Law and Fact' and 'The Ascription of Responsibility and Rights'.

Academic career 

In 1952, Hart was elected Professor of Jurisprudence at Oxford and was a fellow at University College, Oxford, from 1952 to 1973. It was in the summer of that year that he began writing his most famous book, The Concept of Law, though it was not published until 1961. In the interim, he published another major work, Causation in the Law (with Tony Honoré) (1959). He was president of the Aristotelian Society from 1959 to 1960. He gave the 1962 Master-Mind Lecture.

Hart married Jenifer Fischer Williams, a civil servant, later a senior civil servant, in the Home Office and, still later, Oxford historian at St Anne's College (specialising in the history of the police). Jenifer Hart was, for some years in the mid-1930s and fading out totally by decade's end, a 'sleeper' member of the Communist Party of Great Britain. Three decades later she was interviewed by Peter Wright as having been in a position to have passed information to the Soviets, and to Wright, MI5's official spy hunter, she explained her situation; Wright took no action. In fact her work as civil servant was in fields such as family policy and so would have been of no interest to the Soviets. The person who recruited her, Bernard Floud, interviewed by Wright shortly after, maintained that he was unable to remember ever having done so. Nor was her husband in a position to convey to her information of use, despite vague newspaper suggestions, given the sharp separation of his work from that of foreign affairs and its focus on German spies and British turncoats rather than on matters related to the Soviet ally. In fact, Hart was anticommunist.

The marriage contained "incompatible personalities", though it lasted right to the end of their lives and gave joy to both at times. Hart did joke with his daughter at one point, however, that "[t]he trouble with this marriage is that one of us doesn't like sex and the other doesn't like food", and according to LSE law professor Nicola Lacey, Hart was, by his own account, a "suppressed homosexual". Jenifer Hart was believed by her contemporaries to have had an affair of long duration with Isaiah Berlin, a close friend of Hart's. Jenifer published her memoirs under the title Ask Me No More in 1998. The Harts had four children, including, late in life, a son who was disabled, the umbilical cord wrapped around his neck having deprived his brain of oxygen. 

Hart's granddaughter Mojo Mathers became New Zealand's first deaf Member of Parliament in 2011.

There is a description of the Harts' household by the writer on religion Karen Armstrong, who lodged with them for a time to help take care of their disabled son. The description appears in her book The Spiral Staircase.

Hart retired from the Chair of Jurisprudence in 1969 and was succeeded by Ronald Dworkin. He subsequently became principal of Brasenose College, Oxford.

Hart died in Oxford on 19 December 1992, aged 85. He is buried there in Wolvercote Cemetery, which also contains Isaiah Berlin's grave.

Hart's students
Many of Hart's former students have become important legal, moral, and political philosophers, including Brian Barry, Ronald Dworkin, John Finnis, John Gardner, Kent Greenawalt, Peter Hacker, David Hodgson, Neil MacCormick, Joseph Raz, Chin Liew Ten and William Twining.  Hart also had a strong influence on the young John Rawls in the 1950s, when Rawls was a visiting scholar at Oxford shortly after finishing his PhD.

Philosophical method
Hart strongly influenced the application of methods in his version of Anglo-American positive law to jurisprudence and the philosophy of law in the English-speaking world. Influenced by John Austin, Ludwig Wittgenstein and Hans Kelsen, Hart brought the tools of analytic, and especially linguistic, philosophy to bear on the central problems of legal theory.

Hart's method combined the careful analysis of twentieth-century analytic philosophy with the jurisprudential tradition of Jeremy Bentham, the great English legal, political, and moral philosopher. Hart's conception of law had parallels to the Pure Theory of Law formulated by Austrian legal philosopher Hans Kelsen, though Hart rejected several distinctive features of Kelsen's theory.

Significant in the differences between Hart and Kelsen was the emphasis on the British version of positive law theory which Hart was defending as opposed to the Continental version of positive law theory which Kelsen was defending. This was studied in the University of Toronto Law Journal in an article titled "Leaving the Hart-Dworkin Debate" which maintained that Hart insisted in his book The Concept of Law on the expansive reading of positive law theory to include philosophical and sociological domains of assessment rather than the more focused attention of Kelsen who considered Continental positive law theory as more limited to the domain of jurisprudence itself.

Hart drew, among others, on Glanville Williams who had demonstrated his legal philosophy in a five-part article, "Language and the Law" and in a paper, "International Law and the Controversy Concerning the Word 'Law'". In the paper on international law, he sharply attacked the many jurists and international lawyers who had debated whether international law was "really" law. They had been wasting everyone's time, for the question was not a factual one, the many differences between municipal and international law being undeniable, but was simply one of conventional verbal usage, about which individual theorists could please themselves, but had no right to dictate to others.

This approach was to be refined and developed by Hart in the last chapter of The Concept of Law (1961), which showed how the use in respect of different social phenomena of an abstract word like law reflected the fact that these phenomena each shared, without necessarily all possessing in common, some distinctive features. Glanville had himself said as much when editing a student text on jurisprudence and he had adopted essentially the same approach to "The Definition of Crime".

The Concept of Law

Hart's most famous work is The Concept of Law, first published in 1961, and with a second edition (including a new postscript) published posthumously in 1994. The book emerged from a set of lectures that Hart began to deliver in 1952, and it is presaged by his Holmes lecture, Positivism and the Separation of Law and Morals, delivered at Harvard Law School. The Concept of Law developed a sophisticated view of legal positivism. Among the many ideas developed in this book are:
 A critique of John Austin's theory that law is the command of the sovereign backed by the threat of punishment.
 A distinction between primary and secondary legal rules, such that a primary rule governs conduct, such as criminal law, and secondary rules govern the procedural methods by which primary rules are enforced, prosecuted and so on. Hart specifically enumerates three secondary rules; they are:
 The Rule of Recognition, the rule by which any member of society may check to discover what the primary rules of the society are. In a simple society, Hart states, the recognition rule might only be what is written in a sacred book or what is said by a ruler. Hart claimed the concept of rule of recognition as an evolution from Hans Kelsen's "Grundnorm", or "basic norm".
 The Rule of Change, the rule by which existing primary rules might be created, altered or deleted.
 The Rule of Adjudication, the rule by which the society might determine when a rule has been violated and prescribe a remedy.
 A distinction between the internal and external points of view of law and rules, close to (and influenced by) Max Weber's distinction between legal and sociological perspectives in description of law.
 A concept of "open-textured" terms in law, along the lines of Wittgenstein and Waisman, and "defeasible" terms (later famously disavowed):  both are ideas popular in Artificial intelligence and law
 A late reply (published as a postscript to the second edition) to Ronald Dworkin, a rights-oriented legal philosopher (and Hart's successor at Oxford) who criticised Hart's version of legal positivism in Taking Rights Seriously (1977), A Matter of Principle (1985) and Law's Empire (1986).

Other work
With Tony Honoré, Hart wrote and published Causation in the Law (1959, second edition 1985), which is regarded as one of the important academic discussions of causation in the legal context. The early chapters deal philosophically with the concept of cause and are clearly the work of Hart, while later chapters deal with individual cases in English law and are clearly his co-author's.

As a result of his famous debate with Patrick Devlin, Baron Devlin, on the role of the criminal law in enforcing moral norms, Hart wrote Law, Liberty and Morality (1963), which consisted of three lectures he gave at Stanford University. He also wrote The Morality of the Criminal Law (1965). Hart said that he believed Devlin's view of Mill's harm principle as it related to the decriminalisation of homosexuality was "perverse". He later stated that he believed the reforms to the law regarding homosexuality that followed the Wolfenden report "didn't go far enough". Despite this, Hart reported later that he got on well personally with Devlin.

Hart gave lectures to the Labour Party on closing tax loopholes which were being used by the "super-rich". Hart considered himself to be "on the Left, the non-communist Left", and expressed animosity towards Margaret Thatcher.

Writings
 "The Ascription of Responsibility and Rights", Proceedings of the Aristotelian Society (1949)
 Definition and Theory in Jurisprudence (1953)
 Causation in the Law (with Tony Honoré) (1959)
 The Concept of Law (1961;  2nd edn 1994;  3rd edn 2012)
 Law, Liberty and Morality (1963)
 The Morality of the Criminal Law (1964)
 Punishment and Responsibility (1968)
 Essays on Bentham: Studies in Jurisprudence and Political Theory (1982)
 Essays in Jurisprudence and Philosophy (1983)

Festschrift
 Law, Morality, and Society: Essays in Honour of H. L. A. Hart, edited by P. M. S. Hacker and Joseph Raz (1977)

See also

 Hart–Dworkin debate
 Hart–Fuller debate
 Legal interpretivism
 Natural law
 Lon Fuller

Notes

References

Sources
 Nicola Lacey, A Life of H. L. A. Hart: The Nightmare and the Noble Dream, Oxford University Press: 2004 .
 Frederick Schauer, "(Re)Taking Hart," 119 Harv. L. Rev. 852 (2006) (reviewing Lacey, "A Life of H. L. A. Hart").
 Karen Armstrong, The Spiral Staircase, Harper Collins, 2004 
 Carlin Romano, "A Philosopher's Humanity", Chronicle of Higher Education vol. 51 (2005) (reviewing Lacey, "A Life of H. L. A. Hart") link
 Matthew Kramer, H.L.A. Hart  The Nature of Law, Polity: 2018 .

External links

 Short Biography by Tony Honoré [Archived by Wayback Machine]
 Obituary: Professor Herbert Hart in The Independent by Zenon Bankowski
 Herbert Lionel Adolphus Hart 1970–1992 British Academy In Memoriam by Tony Honoré
 

1907 births
1992 deaths
People educated at Bradford Grammar School
People educated at Cheltenham College
Alumni of New College, Oxford
20th-century British writers
20th-century British philosophers
British Jews
Jewish philosophers
English legal scholars
British legal scholars
British political philosophers
Philosophers of law
Fellows of New College, Oxford
Fellows of University College, Oxford
Principals of Brasenose College, Oxford
Ordinary language philosophy
Presidents of the Aristotelian Society
Professors of Jurisprudence (University of Oxford)
English legal writers
MI5 personnel
Bletchley Park people
Fellows of the British Academy
Burials at Wolvercote Cemetery